Copacabana most commonly refers to:

 Copacabana, Rio de Janeiro, Brazil
 Copacabana (nightclub), New York City

Copacabana may also refer to:

Places 
 Copacabana, Catamarca, Argentina
 Copacabana, Bolivia
 Copacabana Municipality, Bolivia
* Fort Copacabana, Brazil
 Copacabana, Antioquia, Colombia
 Copacabana, New South Wales, Gosford, NSW, Australia
 Copacabana Beach in Dubrovnik, Croatia, a lesser-known beach by that name
 Copacabana bus terminus, Harare, Zimbabwe

Arts and entertainment 
 "Copacabana" (song), a 1978 song by Barry Manilow
 Copacabana (1985 film), a 1985 musical TV film based on the song
 Copacabana: The Original Motion Picture Soundtrack Album, soundtrack album for the TV film
Copacabana (musical), a 1994 musical based on the song and the TV film
 Copacabana: Original London Cast Recording
 Copacabana (Sarah Vaughan album), a 1979 album by Sarah Vaughan
 Copacabana (1947 film), starring Groucho Marx and Carmen Miranda
 Copacabana (2010 film), 2010 French film starring Isabelle Huppert

Other uses
 Virgen de Copacabana, the patron saint of Bolivia
 Copacabana Palace, a hotel in Rio de Janeiro
 Copacabana Restaurant, Pike Place Market, Seattle, Washington, U.S.
 Copacabana Hotel, located in Miramar, Havana, Cuba

See also
 COPACOBANA (Cost-Optimized PArallel COde Breaker), a custom-built computer designed to break DES-encrypted messages at a low cost